József Balogh (12 June 1893 – 2 April (?) 1944) was a Hungarian publicist, philologist, and literary historian.

Biography
József Balogh's original family name was Blum. It was due to his father Ármin, the history and literature teacher at the Rabbinical Seminary of Budapest, that he adopted the Hungarian name, Balogh. It was Ármin's connection to the Kornfeld financial family that led Balogh to build an intimate friendship with his future patron Móric Kornfeld, a son-in-law of the industrialist Manfréd Weiss. Both Balogh and Kornfeld converted to Roman Catholicism.

Balogh's main contribution was the creation of The Hungarian Quarterly.

Works
 Vasa lecta et pretiosa: Szent Ágoston konfessziói, egy stílustörténeti tanulmány vázlata (1918)
 Voces Paginarum: Beiträge zur Geschichte des lauten Lesens und Schreibens (1927)
 A klasszikus műveltségért (1934)

References
(English) Frank, Tibor, "Editing as Politics. József Balogh and The Hungarian Quarterly", in The Hungarian Quarterly 34 (1993), No. 129, pp. 5–13.
(English) Demeter, Tamás, "From Classical Studies Towards Epistemology. The Work of József Balogh", in "Studies in East European Thought" 51st Vol. (1999), Issue 4, pp. 287–305
(Hungarian) Frank, Tibor, "A patrisztikától a politikáig. Balogh József (1893–1944)", "Erdei, Gyöngyi/Nagy, Balázs (Hgg.): Változatok a történelemre.Tanulmányok Székely György tiszteletére. Budapesti Történeti Múzeum", Budapest 2004, pp. 391–404.
(English) Széchenyi, Ágnes, "Introduction", in Kornfeld, Móric's Reflections on Twentieth Century Hungary. A Hungarian Magnate's View. Social Science Monographs, Boulder 2007, pp. 1–94

External links
  Biografie in the Hungarian Biographical Lexicon 1000-1990
  József Balogh in the database of the Budapest Holocaust Memorial Center

References 

1893 births
1944 deaths
Hungarian Jews
Hungarian journalists
Hungarian Jews who died in the Holocaust
Converts to Roman Catholicism from Judaism
Philologists